Albertus Petrus Enricus Gerardus Westelaken (2 September 1949 – 4 June 2015), better known by his stage name Albert West, was a Dutch pop singer and record producer. He was the lead singer of The Shuffles from 1963 to 1973. He was born in 's-Hertogenbosch, North Brabant.

Discography

Albums
(selective, charting in Nationale Hitparade LP Top 20, 30, 50) now known as Album Top 100 in the Netherlands)

Albert worked on re-recordings of Brian Hyland material (USA) in 1988.

References

External links

  
 

1949 births
2015 deaths
Dutch pop singers
Dutch record producers
People from 's-Hertogenbosch
Nationaal Songfestival contestants